Acrorchis is a monotypic genus from the orchid family (Orchidaceae), subfamily Epidendroideae, tribe Epidendreae, subtribe Laeliinae.

The only species, Acrorchis roseola, is an epiphytic orchid that occurs in Costa Rica and Panama at heights between 900 and 2,500 m. It is clump-forming, magenta orchid, reaching a height of 15 cm. The sepals and petals of its small flowers have distinct lengths and shapes. The base of the lip has a white  color on the margins.

This orchid is very rare in cultivation.

References

External links 
 photo of herbarium specimen at Missouri Botanical Garden, collected in Panama, holotype of Acrorchis roseola

Laeliinae
Monotypic Epidendroideae genera
Orchids of Costa Rica
Orchids of Panama
Epiphytic orchids
Laeliinae genera